The 2013 Gent–Wevelgem was the 75th running of the Gent–Wevelgem single-day cycling race.

The race was won by Slovakia's Peter Sagan of the  team, after making a solo attack with  remaining, and ultimately held on to win the race by 23 seconds ahead of a group of nine riders.

Teams
As Gent–Wevelgem was a UCI World Tour event, all UCI ProTeams were invited automatically and obligated to send a squad. Originally, eighteen ProTeams were invited to the race, with six other squads given wildcard places, and as such, would have formed the event's 24-team peloton.  subsequently regained their ProTour status after an appeal to the Court of Arbitration for Sport. With  not originally invited to the race, race organisers announced their inclusion to the race, bringing the total number of teams competing to twenty-five. Each of the 25 teams were allowed to enter eight riders to the race, making up a maximum starting peloton of 200 riders.

The 25 teams that competed in the race were:

Results

References

External links

Gent–Wevelgem
Gent-Wevelgem
Gent-Wevelgem